"Ciega, Sordomuda"  is a song by Colombian singer Shakira from her fourth studio album, Dónde Están los Ladrones? (1998).  A pop rock track, it utilizes mariachi trumpets and lyrically equates total love to a person being blind, deaf, and mute. It was released as the album's lead single on 4 September 1998 by Columbia Records and Sony Discos. The lyrics were written by Shakira. Its music was co-composed by Shakira and Estéfano, while produced by the singer and Lester Méndez.

"Ciega Sordomuda" received positive reactions from music critics, who praised the instruments used and compared it to Shakira's breakout hit "Estoy Aquí". The song was nominated in the category of Pop Song of the Year at the 1999 Lo Nuestro Awards and was a recipient of a Broadcast Music, Inc. (BMI) Latin Award in 2000. An accompanying music video was filmed in Miami, Florida and directed by Gustavo Garzón. The film depicts Shakira and her partner being chased by cyber police after escaping jail. The song was included in the set list for the Tour Anfibio, Tour of the Mongoose, the Oral Fixation Tour, and The Sun Comes Out World Tour. Shakira also performed an acoustic version of the song for her first live album, MTV Unplugged (2000). Commercially, the track topped the Billboard Hot Latin Songs and Latin Pop Airplay charts in the United States; it also became a number-one hit in Costa Rica, Panama and her native Colombia; and reached the top-ten in five other countries.

Background and composition
After rising to prominence with the success of her major-label debut album Pies Descalzos (1995), Shakira was introduced to Emilio Estefan, the most important producer in the Hispanic market at the time, by her promoter and longtime friend, Jairo Martínez. Estefan was renowned for launching the careers of several Hispanic singers, including Enrique Iglesias, Thalía, and his wife Gloria Estefan. He decided to work with Shakira as he identified her potential to break into the US Latin market, though one of Shakira's concerns about working with Estefan was creative control over her music. Before signing their contract, the roles and duties were finalized: Estefan would be her manager and executive producer, but she would be in charge of all material and arrangements and have final approval over her records. She later stated about Estefan, "He had a great respect for me as an artist and trusted me totally on this project." Since then, they started working on Estefan's Crescent Moon Studios in Miami. She insisted on perfection, working on the material to the point of exhaustion. "I made two or three demos of each song. I became a human being so demanding of myself that until the song made my hair stand on end, I wouldn't stop".

Equipment for the recording of Dónde Están los Ladrones? included old amplifiers to achieve a better sound, a 40-year-old German microphone, and several innovations in the instrumental mixes. Dónde Están los Ladrones? took nine months to produce, more than Shakira's previous records since more people were involved on this album. Shakira commented, "To me it's a normal time, the gestation period for a baby. But many people wag their finger and tell me that the next one cannot take so long..." Shakira was involved with the compositions for all the tracks in the album, including "Ciega, Sordomuda", which she co-wrote with Colombian musician Estéfano, with productions being handled by the singer and Lester Méndez. Musically, "Ciega, Sordomuda" is a pop rock song that equates "total love to being blind, deaf, and mute" and incorporates mariachi trumpets at various points. Lyrically, Shakira describes herself as "brute, blind, deaf, dumb, clumsy, fretful, stubborn" to a love who has her "haggard, skinny, ugly, disheveled, clumsy, dumb, slow, foolish, unhinged, completely out of control".

Reception
John Lannert of Billboard noted that the track "strongly resembles" to her breakout hit, "Estoy Aquí" (1995). The Dallas Morning News critic Mario Tarradell regarded "Ciega, Sordomuda" as "an obvious first single" with its "jittery pop-rock feel" and also made a comparison to "Estoy Aquí". Mark Kemp, writing for the book The New Rolling Stone Album Guide, felt that the artist "pays tribute to her Latin roots in the Spanish guitars and trumpets". The Latin Beat Magazine editor Franz Reynold called the song a "mid-tempo rocker dedicated to the horrors of emotional co-dependency-with mariachi-style brass flitting in and out of the spare vocal and the airy strum of guitars." Ramiro Burr of the San Antonio Express-News found it to be one of the album's "catchy tunes", while a writer for The Asahi Shimbun found the track to be "especially addictive". On the review of the album for Newsday, Richard Torres observed the "cry of individuality" in the song.

"Ciega, Sordomuda" was nominated in the category of Pop Song of the Year at the 11th Annual Lo Nuestro Awards in 1999, but ultimately lost to "La Copa de la Vida" by Ricky Martin. It was acknowledged as an award-winning song at the 2000 BMI Latin Awards. "Ciega, Sordomuda" ranked number 89 on Billboards "The 98 Greatest Songs of 1998", with Leila Cobo noting that the song "broke completely with everything popular Latina musicians had been doing up to that point". It was listed among Shakira's 26 Best Songs by HipLatina.

In the US, "Ciega Sordomuda" debuted at number seven on the Billboard Hot Latin Songs chart on the week of 24 October 1998. It reached the summit a month later later, spending three weeks at this spot. The song also topped the Latin Pop Airplay chart and peaked at number seven in Spain. In November 1999, it was labeled as one of the "hottest tracks" for Sony Discos in a list including the most successful songs released by the label since the launching of the Billboard Hot Latin Tracks chart in 1986.

Promotion and live performances
"Ciega, Sordomuda" was released to radio stations worldwide as the album's lead single on 4 September 1998. It was later included on her greatest hits album Grandes Éxitos (2002). The music video for the song was directed by Gustavo Garzón and filmed in Miami. The film depicts Shakira being jailed and escaping with her partner. They are then chased by several policemen, who are revealed to be robots at the end. Various scenes include the couple driving blindfolded and Shakira performing with guests dancing in the background. The video was nominated in the category of Video of the Year at the 1999 Lo Nuestro Awards, but ultimately lost to "Esperanza" by Enrique Iglesias.

"Ciega, Sordomuda" was included on the set list for the following tours: Tour Anfibio (2000), Tour of the Mongoose (2002–03), the Oral Fixation Tour (2006–07), and The Sun Comes Out World Tour (2010–11), The Los Angeles Times writer Ernesto Lechner noted Shakira's "disjointed robotic movements" while she performed the track at the Arrowhead Pond in 2000. For The Sun Comes Tour, a Stroh violin was used to replace the horn sections of the original recording. David Hardwick from Spinning Platters said the use of the instrument was "impressive". She also sung the track during the 11th Annual Lo Nuestro Awards and Miss Colombia 1999. In August 1999, Shakira sang an acoustic version of "Ciega, Sordomuda" during an episode of MTV Unplugged in New York City as a mariachi tune, where she was accompanied by El Mariachi Los Mora Arriaga. The performance was included on her first live album, MTV Unplugged (2000). As part of The Latin Recording Academy tribute to Shakira, who was presented with the Person of the Year accolade in 2011, Mexican singer Alejandro Guzmán and Spanish musician Natalia Jiménez performed "Ciega, Sordomuda" as a duet.

Formats and track listings
Promotional single
 "Ciega, Sordomuda"4:28

Pablo Flores remixes single
 "Ciega, Sordomuda" (album version)3:52
 "Ciega, Sordomuda" (12" full mix)10:51
 "Ciega, Sordomuda" (12" single edit)4:36
 "Ciega, Sordomuda" (dub mix)8:01
 "Ciega, Sordomuda" (radio edit)4:37

Credits and personnel
Credits adapted from the liner notes of "Ciega, Sordomuda".

Marcelo Acevedoacoustic guitar
Tommy Anthonybacking vocalist
Estéfanosongwriting
Julio Hernándezbass guitar
Sebastian Krysmixing
Lester Mendezproducer, keyboards, programmer
Shakirasongwriting, producer, lead vocals
Claudio Speiwakacoustic guitar
Nicolás Tovarbacking vocalist
Teddy Mulettrumpet
Adam Zimmonelectric guitar

Charts

Covers
The song was covered by Croatian singer Vesna Pisarović under the title "Da je meni (oko moje)". This version served as the second single from Pisarović's sophomore album Za tebe stvorena.

See also
List of number-one Billboard Hot Latin Tracks of 1998
List of Billboard Latin Pop Airplay number ones of 1998

References

1998 singles
1998 songs
Spanish-language songs
Shakira songs
Songs written by Shakira
Songs written by Estéfano
Pop rock songs
Columbia Records singles
Sony Discos singles